Moni is the second most important god in the pre-Islamic pantheon of the Nuristani people.

Moni may refer to:

People
 Moni people, an ethnic group in Western New Guinea
 Aminul Huq Moni (1949–2015), Bangladeshi sports organizer and media executive
 Christophe Moni (born 1972), French rugby union player
 Dipu Moni (born 1965), Bangladeshi politician, former Minister of Education and Foreign Minister
 Md. Moniruzzaman Moni, 21st century Bangladeshi politician
 Mohammad Ali Moni, Bangladeshi computer engineer, researcher and data analyst
 Moni Bhattacharjee, Indian film director and screenwriter
 Moni Fanan (1946–2009), Israeli basketball team manager
 Moni Mohsin (born 1963), British-Pakistani writer
 Moni Moshonov (born 1951), Israeli actor and comedian
 Moni Naor, Israeli computer scientist
 Moni Ovadia (born 1946), Italian actor, musician, singer and author
 Moni Singh (1901–1990), Bengali communist politician
 Moni, nickname of Hassan Chaito (footballer, born 1989), Lebanese footballer
 Pori Moni, stage name of Bangladeshi actress Shamsunnahar Smrity (born 1992)

Places
 Moni, a village, part of the village of Sougia), Crete
 Moni, Cyprus, a village in Cyprus
 Moni a small town in central Flores island close to Kelimutu volcano

Other uses
 Monnett Moni, motorglider